Giles Masters was appointed as the second Attorney General of the Dominion of New England on the 30 of August, 1687 and the first under the reign of Sir Edmund Andros. His service as Attorney General expired no earlier than August 25, 1687.

Masters was sworn in as an attorney in 1686. He was described as “not sympathetic toward our people”, and he was known as "King's Attorney". He reportedly had a relative named "Katherine Masters".
   
Giles Masters died on February 29, 1688.

References

1688 deaths
People of colonial Massachusetts
Year of birth unknown